Provincial Highway 22 is a highway that started from Nanzih District, just north of downtown Kaohsiung, and ended in Gaoshu, Pingtung County. The highway passes through Dashe, Yanchao, and Cishan in Kaohsiung City, and Ligang in Pingtung County. The highway is known as Qinan Highway (旗楠公路) for the stretch between Cishan and Nanzih. The route length is 34.321 km.

See also
 Highway system in Taiwan

References

External links

Highways in Taiwan